Those Things is the second album by songwriter and music producer Miguel Migs, released in 2007. The album peaked at number 15 on the US Top Electronic Albums chart. It is an album that ranges from deep house to hip house, with each being solid productions overall. Those Things features vocal performances by Migs's main vocalist on his songs, Lisa Shaw, Aya, Tim Fuller, and reggae artist Junior Reid. The album features more live instrumentation than Migs' début album and includes a guest appearance by Fred Ross of Sly and the Family Stone. The lead single, "So Far", peaked at number six on the Hot Dance Club Play chart.

Critical reception
Allmusic's Rick Anderson described the album as "a perfectly functional dance collection that achieves occasional greatness". Dave Hoffman of PopMatters described it as the "first great electronica album of 2007, showcasing an adventurous, world-class producer at the top of his game".

Track listing

Those Things Remixed
In 2008, a remix album of Those Things was released, titled, "Those Things Remixed". In some regions, "Those Things Remixed" was released as an additional disc alongside the standard edition of the album.

References

2007 albums
Miguel Migs albums
Soul albums by American artists